Hounded by Fury is an album by the Welsh experimental music group, Hwyl Nofio, released in 2006.

Track listing
"A Walk with Mr Gorey"
"Living In Shadows"
"Sanctify"
"Lost Man Found On a Railway Track"
"Riding the Echoes of a Strange Situation"
"The Darkened Windows of a Ghost Train North"
"Child Woman"
"The Fish in the Tide"
"Broken Again"
"The Function of Space"
"Touched by Fire"
"Chapter 27"

Personnel
Steve Parry: guitar, adapted guitars, ukulele, adapted viola, piano, church organ, bass, electronics, organ
Trevor Stainsby: acoustic guitar processing (track 11)
Fredrik Soegaard: midi fractal guitar image converter (track 11)
Sandor Szabo: guzheng (track 7)
Mark Powell: saxophone (track 1)
Gorwel Owen: imagined banjo (track 8)

References

External links
.
http://www.musiquemachine.com/articles/articles_template.php?id=81
https://web.archive.org/web/20111104090220/http://aquariusrecords.org/cat/h29.html

Hwyl Nofio albums
2006 albums